Moses Sanders (26 September 1873 – 1941) was an English footballer who played in the Football League for Accrington, Preston North End and Woolwich Arsenal.

Professional baseball
In 1890 Sanders played lef field professionally for Preston North End Baseball Club in the National League of Baseball of Great Britain.

References

1873 births
1941 deaths
English footballers
Association football midfielders
English Football League players
Crewe Alexandra F.C. players
Preston North End F.C. players
Arsenal F.C. players
Dartford F.C. players
Accrington F.C. players
English baseball players